C'est moi may refer to:

poem by Marceline Desbordes-Valmore, set to music by :fr:Marie Mennessier-Nodier
C'est moi (Lerner and Loewe song), see Camelot (musical)
C'est moi (Jérôme song), hit 1974 song by C. Jérôme
C'est moi (Marie-Mai song), No.83 in Canada